The Oscar Crow House is a historic house at 404 Washington Street in Star City, Arkansas.  The single story wood-frame house was built in 1929 by Robert and Doug Verdue for Oscar Crow, owner of a local drug store.  The Craftsman style house resembles a shotgun house, but does not exactly follow that form, because its rooms do not progress linearly from the front.  The front of the house has a recessed porch supported by box columns, with a vent placed in the gable-end pediment.  The front entry is flanked by three-over-one sash windows.  The north (right side) elevation has four three-over-one windows that are irregularly spaced, and the south side has two such windows, also irregularly spaced.  The rear of the house also has a recessed porch.  Exposed rafters decorate the roof line.

The house was listed on the National Register of Historic Places in 1992, as a well-preserved example of restrained Craftsman style.

See also
National Register of Historic Places listings in Lincoln County, Arkansas

References 

Houses on the National Register of Historic Places in Arkansas
Houses completed in 1929
Houses in Lincoln County, Arkansas
National Register of Historic Places in Lincoln County, Arkansas
Star City, Arkansas
1929 establishments in Arkansas
American Craftsman architecture in Arkansas